The Laureate Badge of Madrid was the highest military award for gallantry of the Second Spanish Republic. It was awarded in recognition of action, either individual or collective, to protect the nation and its citizens in the face of immediate risk to the bearer or bearers' life. Those eligible were members of the Spanish Republican Armed Forces and testimonies of reliable witnesses were checked prior to concession.

Named after the capital of Spain, symbolizing courage and the defence of the Republic during the Siege of Madrid throughout the Spanish Civil War, the Laureate Badge of Madrid was established on 25 May 1937 as the Spanish Republican equivalent to the Laureate Cross of Saint Ferdinand awarded by the monarchy and the Nationalist faction.

Awardees
A total of 8 people were awarded this medal: 
Spanish Republican Army
Vicente Rojo Lluch, General of the Popular Army and Chief of the General Staff
José Miaja Menant, General of the Popular Army
Manuel Fontela Frois, Major of the Republican Cavalry
Domiciano Leal Sargenta and Manuel Álvarez Álvarez, Majors of the Militia for their role in the Battle of the Ebro (posthumously)
Spanish Republican Navy
Luis González de Ubieta, Admiral of the Republican Armada for his role in sinking heavy cruiser Baleares in the Battle of Cabo de Palos, the biggest naval battle of the Spanish Civil War.
Ambrosio Ristori de la Cuadra, Major of the Infantería de Marina (posthumously), for his exploits in the siege of the Alcazar and the Battle of Seseña, where he was killed in action
Spanish Republican Air Force
Leocadio Mendiola Núñez, Major of the Air Force, for services rendered (Although awarded, Mendiola never did receive the medal after the fall of the Second Spanish Republic)

Distintivo de Madrid

The Distintivo de Madrid (Madrid Distinction) was an award related to the Laureate Plate which was established by the Second Spanish Republic in order to reward courage. It was awarded to the Spanish Republican Navy personnel and vessels that took part in the Battle of Cape Palos in January 1938.

Following the grant of the Laureate Badge of Madrid to Luis González de Ubieta, Admiral of the loyalist fleet, the Distintivo de Madrid was awarded to Spanish Republican Navy cruisers Libertad and Méndez Núñez, and destroyers Lepanto, Almirante Antequera and Sánchez Barcáiztegui, as well as to their crew members for their role in the Battle of Cape Palos. 
These ships would thenceforward fly a special pennant and the men would wear a special badge on their uniforms with the old coat of arms of Madrid.

See also
List of military decorations - Spain
Order of the Spanish Republic

References

External links 
Reglamento de la Placa Laureada de Madrid. Gaceta de la República: Diario Oficial, núm 145, 25 de mayo de 1937:
       
Placa Laureada de Madrid
Segunda República (1931-1939)
República - EPR, Condecoraciones

1937 establishments in Spain
1939 disestablishments in Spain
Madrid
Armed Forces of the Second Spanish Republic
Military awards and decorations of the Spanish Civil War
History of Madrid
Awards established in 1937
Awards disestablished in 1939
Awards and decorations of the Second Spanish Republic